Nicole Koller (born 2 May 1997) is a Swiss professional racing cyclist.

She competed at the 2021 UCI Road World Championships in the mixed team relay and the women's road race events. The following year, she won the gold medal with the Swiss national team in the mixed team relay.

Major results

Cyclo-cross

2013–2014
 3rd Süpercross Baden
2014–2015
 EKZ CrossTour
2nd Baden
2nd Dielsdorf
2015–2016
 2nd National Championships
 EKZ CrossTour
3rd Hittnau
2016–2017
 1st Overall EKZ CrossTour
1st Hittnau
 1st Internationales Radquer Steinmaur
 3rd National Championships
2017–2018
 EKZ CrossTour
3rd Eschenbach
2018–2019
 2nd National Championships
2019–2020
 EKZ CrossTour
2nd Meilen
2020–2021
 1st  National Championships
 1st Overall EKZ CrossTour
2nd Bern

MTB
2014
 1st  Junior cross-country, UCI World Championships
 2nd  Junior cross-country, European Championships
2015
 2nd  Junior cross-country, European Championships
 3rd  Junior cross-country, UCI World Championships

Road
2014
 2nd  Road race, European Junior Road Championships
 3rd Road race, National Junior Road Championships
2015
 2nd Road race, National Junior Road Championships
2022
 1st  Mixed team relay, UCI Road World Championships

References

External links

1997 births
Swiss female cyclists
Living people
Swiss mountain bikers
Cyclo-cross cyclists
UCI Road World Champions (women)